Isfahan County is in Isfahan province, Iran. The capital of the county is the city of Isfahan. At the 2006 census, the county's population was 1,963,315 in 543,688 households. The following census in 2011 counted 2,174,172 people in 657,857 households. At the 2016 census, the county's population was 2,243,249 in 707,870 households.

Five districts were separated from Isfahan County in 2021. Bon Rud District became Varzaneh County; Jarqavieh Olya and Jarqavieh Sofla Districts formed Jarqavieh County; Jolgeh District became Harand County; and Kuhpayeh District formed Kuhpayeh County.

Administrative divisions

The population history and structural changes of Isfahan County's administrative divisions over three consecutive censuses are shown in the following table. The latest census shows six districts, 18 rural districts, and 14 cities.

See also 

 List of historical structures in Isfahan province

References

 

Counties of Isfahan Province